Ethical Perspectives is a peer-reviewed academic journal in the field of philosophy, established in 1994 and published by Peeters Online Journals. It publishes articles in English, focusing on ethics and related fields. It is edited by Helder De Schutter.

Abstracting and indexing
The journal is indexed in the following services:

References

External links
Ethical Perspectives

Ethics journals
Publications established in 1994
English-language journals